Benny Prawira Siauw (born in Jakarta, 1 February 1989) is a suicidologist, founder and head coordinator of Into The Light Indonesia community, which focuses on suicide prevention in Indonesia.

Background and education 
Benny receives his Bachelor of Psychology from Bunda Mulia University and Master of Social Health Psychology from Atma Jaya Catholic University of Indonesia.

Between 2013 and 2015, Benny is one of the member of Youth Advisory Board from National Center for The Prevention of Youth Suicide, a research institution founded by American Association of Suicidology with the focus for suicide prevention among youths.

Into The Light Indonesia 
Benny founded Into The Light Indonesia in 2012 after he found a number of suicide news from Indonesian online media and after he revealed some of his friends were having suicidal thoughts.

In 2013, Benny and some of his friends formed an ad-hoc committee to commemorate World Suicide Prevention Day 2013 titled "Into The Light". The ad-hoc were later changed into a community afterwards, and since then was the first Indonesian youth-based suicide prevention community. Along with his vision, the community were based and utilizes scientific and human rights-based approach.

Benny Prawira were featured in several prominent Indonesian media, including in Opini.id, Kick Andy Metro TV, Liputan 6, and SINDOnews.com

References 

Living people
1989 births
Indonesian people of Chinese descent
Indonesian activists